Shiniuzhai National Geological Park or Pingjiang Shiniuzhai Geopark (石牛寨) is located in Hunan, in Pingjiang County. It is 46 km away from the nearest city of Pingjiang. Shi Nui Zhai is 523 meters above sea level, and occupies a radius of more than 10 square kilometres. It is one of the protected areas of China.

Shiniuzhai National Geological Park

History
The origins of the name Shi Niu Zhai come from the boulder that resembles a cattle in the west part of the park. Shi Nui Zhai used to be an important place for military affairs. According to a historian in the western province, Shi Niu Zhai is the last remaining shanzhai of the 48 in Liuyang.

Geography
Shi Niu Zhai is a national park that is made up of mainly Danxia landform- red bed characterised by steep cliffs.

Tourism 
The 3 main attractions of Shiniuzhai includes Ten Miles Cliff (十里绝壁), Hundred Miles Danxia (百里丹霞) and Brave Men's Bridge (高空玻璃桥).

The Ten Miles cliff is located at the center of the park, is one of China's biggest Danxia cliffs. The Hundred Miles Danxia is located at the peak of Shi Nui Zhai where one can see the entire landscape of many other Danxia Peaks.

Attractions 
Shi Nui Zhai Park has developed many tourist attractions activities. It has one of the steepest cable car in China; highest and longest suspension bridge in Hunan, the Brave Men's Bridge; Asia's longest zipline.

Brave Men's Bridge
The Brave Men's Bridge is a glass suspension bridge that is 300 meters long, elevated at a height of 180 meter above ground.

The bridge's body is made up of 2 main steel wires and 6 base steel wires with wooden planks as base. It is the first high altitude glass bottomed bridge built in China. The bridge was originally made of wood but converted to glass in 2014. The new glass bottom was made using glass panes 24mm thick and 25 times the strength of normal glass panels.

The origin of the name Brave Men's Bridge is passed down from word of mouth that anyone that is able to cross the fearsome bridge is a true brave man.

Ten Miles Cliff 
The Ten Miles Cliff is a cliff located in the Shiniuzhai National Geological park. On the cliff, there is man-made plank structures built to serve as walking paths for the tourist.

See also
 Zhangjiajie Glass Bridge

References

Yueyang
Protected areas of China